15th FFCC Awards
December 20, 2010

Best Picture:
The Social Network

The 15th Florida Film Critics Circle Awards were given on December 20, 2010.

Winners

 Best Actor:
 Colin Firth – The King's Speech
 Best Actress:
 Natalie Portman – Black Swan
 Best Adapted Screenplay:
 Aaron Sorkin – The Social Network
 Best Animated Film:
 Toy Story 3
 Best Art Direction/Production Design:
 Inception – Brad Ricker and Guy Hendrix Dyas Best Cinematography:
 Inception – Wally Pfister Best Director:
 David Fincher – The Social Network
 Best Documentary Film:
 The Tillman Story
 Best Film:
 The Social Network
 Best Foreign Language Film:
 I Am Love (Io sono l'amore) • Italy Best Original Screenplay:
 Christopher Nolan – Inception
 Best Supporting Actor:
 Christian Bale – The Fighter
 Best Supporting Actress:
 Melissa Leo – The Fighter
 Best Visual Effects:
 Inception''
 Pauline Kael Breakout Award:
 Jennifer Lawrence – Winter's Bone
 Golden Orange for Outstanding Contribution to Film:
 Matthew Curtis, programming director for the Enzian Theater and Florida Film Festival in Orlando

References

External links
 

2010 film awards
2010s